Broxburn Athletic Football Club was a football club from Broxburn in West Lothian.

History
The club's first known matches were part of a five-a-side tournament at the close of the 1886–87 season.  The club originally played as a Junior club.  

The club became a senior club in 1905 and started to enter the Scottish Cup via the qualifying cup competition.  The club reached the first round proper of the Cup on one occasion, in 1911–12.  The club had lost twice in the early rounds of the qualifying competition but had the results overturned on appeal.  On the first occasion, the replayed match against West Calder Swifts F.C. was abandoned after 85 minutes due a pitch invasion from the Swifts' fans, and the score at the time - 1–0 to Broxburn - was allowed to stand.

In the competition itself, Athletic beat Beith F.C. in the first round 6–0, before a crowd of a mere 400.  Third Lanark was much too strong in the second round, beating Athletic 6–1, Raitt scoring a hat-trick, and the Blues' consolation coming from M'Laren on the stroke of half-time, when the club was already three down.

At the start of April 1912, the Athletic and Broxburn F.C. agreed to a merger, the new club to be called Broxburn United.  The last match for the clubs was the final of the Gardeners' Cup (a charity invitational competition of long standing), won by Broxburn; a week later for Athletics players played for Broxburn against Rangers in a friendly "with a view to testing their qualifications for 'The United'".

Colours

The club originally played in maroon, changing to blue in 1906.

Ground

The club's home ground was Albion (now Albyn) Park.

References

Defunct football clubs in Scotland
Association football clubs established in 1887
Association football clubs disestablished in 1912
Football in West Lothian
1887 establishments in Scotland
1912 disestablishments in Scotland